The Rehberg is a prominent hill, in the German state of Rhineland-Palatinate. After the Grand Wintersberg (ca. 581 m) in French North Alsace, the Rehberg is the second highest hill in the Wasgau, the Franco-German region that forms the southern part of the Palatine Forest and runs from the valley of the River Queich to the Col de Saverne . The Rehberg is also the highest hill on German soil in the Wasgau. As part of the Palatine Forest-North Vosges Biosphere Reserve it has been placed under special protection measures.

It lies two kilometres south of the town of Annweiler and has an observation tower at the summit named the Rehberg tower after the hill. The tower offers visitors an unhindered panoramic view over large parts of the Palatine Forest and Upper Rhine Plain as far as the hill chains of the Odenwald, Black Forest and Vosges.

Literature

References

External links 

 Panoramic view from the Rehberg tower
 Website of the Palatine Forest Nature Park
 Website of the Palatinate Hiking Portal
 Website of the Palatine Forest Club

Mountains and hills of the Palatinate Forest
South Palatinate
Anterior Palatinate
Mountains and hills of Rhineland-Palatinate
Südliche Weinstraße